Idro is a town and comune in the province of Brescia, in Lombardy. It is situated near the southwestern end of Lake Idro, and at the northeastern end of the Valle Sabbia. Bordering communes are Anfo, Bagolino, Bondone, Capovalle, Lavenone, Treviso Bresciano and Valvestino.

Sources

External links

https://web.archive.org/web/20071020233603/http://www.vallesabbia.info/bin/index.php?id=47

Cities and towns in Lombardy